Slana  may refer to:

 Slana, Alaska, a populated place in the Copper River Census Area
 Slana River, in Alaska, a tributary of Copper River
 Slana, Croatia, a village near Petrinja
 Slana concentration camp, existed during World War II on the island of Pag in Croatia
 Slaná river, in Slovakia and Hungary, a tributary to Tisza
 Slaná (Semily District), a village in the Czech Republic